High, Wide and Handsome is a 1937 American musical Western film starring Irene Dunne, Randolph Scott, Alan Hale, Sr., Charles Bickford and Dorothy Lamour. The film was directed by Rouben Mamoulian and written by Oscar Hammerstein II and George O'Neil, with lyrics by Hammerstein and music by Jerome Kern. It was released by Paramount Pictures.

Plot
In 1859, Doc Watterson brings his traveling medicine show to Titusville, Pennsylvania. After the show wagon is destroyed by an accidental fire, Mrs. Cortlandt and her grandson Peter invite the Wattersons and the show's fake Indian, Mac, to stay with them. Peter and Sally fall in love.

Railroad tycoon Walt Brennan wants to acquire the land of several oil-drilling farmers, led by Peter Cortlandt. The townspeople block the plan, assisted by a herd of circus elephants, and instead construct their own oil pipeline.

Cast

Production 
Irene Dunne had starred in the previous year's film adaptation of Kern and Hammerstein's classic musical Show Boat, and the character of Doc is similar to the Cap'n Andy character from the earlier film. Dorothy Lamour sings a torch song in High, Wide and Handsome, as did Helen Morgan in the Show Boat adaptation.

Music
The film includes the classic Kern-Hammerstein songs "Can I Forget You?" and "The Folks Who Live on the Hill." With the assistance of Kern and Hammerstein, director Rouben Mamoulian attempted to firmly integrate the songs into the plot of the film in order to advance the storyline.

Reception
Frank S. Nugent of The New York Times wrote: "A richly produced, spectacular and melodious show, it moves easily into the ranks of the season's best and probably is as good an all-around entertainment as we are likely to find on Broadway this summer." Variety reported that the film had "too much Hollywood hokum" and that it "flounders as it progresses, and winds up in a melodramatic shambles of fisticuffs, villainy and skullduggery which smacks of the serial film school." Harrison's Reports called it "very good mass entertainment" with "delightful" music but a story that was "very weak." Russell Maloney of The New Yorker wrote: "Mamoulian's handling of the story leaves something to be desired (he's pretty preoccupied with apple blossoms and hillsides) but the general effect of the picture is pleasant."

Writing for Night and Day in 1937, Graham Greene gave the film a poor review, characterizing it as "two hours of [a] long, dumb and dreary picture." Greene noted that the Hollywood aesthetics attributable to Mamoulian made the film unrealistic and improbable.

The film was not a success when released, partly because it was shown in roadshow format, which caused it to lose more money than it normally would have.

References

Green, Stanley (1999) Hollywood Musicals Year by Year (2nd ed.), pub. Hal Leonard Corporation  pages 70–71

External links
 
 
 
 

1937 films
Paramount Pictures films
American black-and-white films
1930s English-language films
Films directed by Rouben Mamoulian
1937 musical films
American Western (genre) musical films
1937 Western (genre) films
Films set in the 1850s
1930s Western (genre) musical films
1930s American films